Kurtoxin is a toxin found in the venom of the scorpion Parabuthus transvaalicus. It affects the gating of voltage-gated sodium channels and calcium channels.

Sources 
Kurtotoxin is found in the venom of the South African scorpion Parabuthus transvaalicus.

Chemistry 
Kurtoxin is a protein containing 63 amino acid residues with a mass of 7386.1 daltons. Its formula is C324H478N94O90S8. It can be isolated from the venom of Parabuthus transvaalicus by high-performance liquid chromatography (HPLC). Kurtoxin is closely related to α-scorpion toxins, a family of toxins that slow inactivation of voltage-gated sodium channels. The complete primary amino-acid sequence of kurtoxin is: KIDGYPVDYW NCKRICWYNN KYCNDLCKGL KADSGYCWGW TLSCYCQGLP DNARIKRSGR CRA.

Target 
In research on Xenopus oocytes it was found that kurtoxin affects low-threshold α1G and α1H calcium channels, but not the high-threshold α1A, α1B, α1C, and α1E Ca channels. Like other α-scorpion toxins kurtoxin was also found to interact with voltage-gated sodium channels. 
In rat neurons, less selectivity for kurtoxin on calcium channels is found. Here the toxin interacts with high affinity with T-type, L-type, N-type, and P-type channels.

Mode of action 
Kurtoxin inhibits ion calcium channels by modifying channel gating. The effect of the toxin is voltage-dependent. In a voltage-clamp experiment it was found that calcium channels are more strongly inhibited by minor depolarization than by a strong depolarization of the cell. The peptide toxin binds close to the channel voltage sensor and thereby produces complex gating modifications specific for each channel type. In rats, kurtoxin inhibited T-type, L-type, and N-type Ca channels and facilitated P-type channels. Deactivation was accelerated in T-type and L-type channels, slowed down in P-type channels and not affected in N-type calcium channels. 
Kurtoxin also has an effect on sodium channels. It slows down both activation and inactivation of the channel.

References 
Chuang, R.S., Jaffe, H., Cribbs, L., Perez-Reyes, E., Swartz, K.J. (1998). Inhibition of T-type voltage-gated calcium channels by a new scorpion toxin. Nature Neuroscience 1(8), 668–674. 
Sidach, S.S., Mintz, I.M. (2002). Kurtoxin, a gating modifier of neuronal high- and low threshold Ca channels. The Journal of Neuroscience, 22(6), 2023–2034. 

Neurotoxins
Ion channel toxins